Roberto Córdoba Asensi (born 4 December 1962) is a Spanish former road cyclist, who competed as a professional from 1985 to 1992.

Major results
1986
 5th Barcelona–Andorra
 8th Overall Vuelta a Murcia
1st Stage 5
 8th Trofeo Masferrer
1987
 1st Clásica a los Puertos de Guadarrama
 1st Trofeo Masferrer
 9th Overall Euskal Bizikleta
1988
 10th Overall Vuelta a España

Grand Tour general classification results timeline

References

External links

1962 births
Living people
Spanish male cyclists
Cyclists from Madrid